Perkiomen Creek is a  tributary of the Schuylkill River in Berks, Lehigh and Montgomery counties, Pennsylvania.  The water course was also named Perquaminck Creek, on Thomas Holme's 1687 map.

The creek begins in Hereford Township, Berks County, initially flows eastward into Upper Milford Township, Lehigh County, and turns southward to reenter Hereford Township before entering Montgomery County. It is from the Lenape term Pakihm Unk (pronounced for Pah Keym Unk), which means "cranberry place" in English.

The Green Lane Reservoir is formed by a dam on the creek on the north side of Green Lane that backs up water from there to the north of Route 663.

Perkiomen Creek joins the Schuylkill River approximately 1.7 miles (2.7 km) downstream of the community of Audubon, the location of the National Audubon Society wildlife sanctuary Mill Grove Farm, once the estate of 19th-century ornithologist John James Audubon. Its largest tributary is East Branch Perkiomen Creek.

The Perkiomen Trail was established in 2003 as a partnership with the Montgomery County Planning Commission and local governments to provide a walking, jogging, and biking path along the creek that stretches south from Green Lane Reservoir Park to near the Schuylkill River where it meets the Schuylkill River Trail.

See also
List of rivers of Pennsylvania

References

External links

U.S. Geological Survey: PA stream gaging stations

Rivers of Berks County, Pennsylvania
Rivers of Lehigh County, Pennsylvania
Rivers of Montgomery County, Pennsylvania
Rivers of Pennsylvania
Tributaries of the Schuylkill River